Seinäjoki ("Wall River"; , formerly ) is a city located in South Ostrobothnia, Finland;  east of Vaasa,  north of Tampere,  west of Jyväskylä and  southwest of Oulu. Seinäjoki originated around the Östermyra bruk iron and gunpowder factories founded in 1798. Seinäjoki became a municipality in 1868, market town in 1931 and town in 1960. In 2005, the municipality of Peräseinäjoki was merged into Seinäjoki, and in the beginning of 2009, the neighbouring municipalities of Nurmo and Ylistaro were consolidated with Seinäjoki. Seinäjoki is one of the fastest growing regional centers in Finland.

The city hall, city library, Lakeuden Risti Church and other public buildings were designed by Alvar Aalto. Seinäjoki was historically called  in Swedish. Today this name, which never was official, is very seldom used even among the Swedish speakers. Seinäjoki railway station in city center was opened in 1883 and until 1897 it carried the name Östermyra station.

History
The settlement spread in the area of the present Seinäjoki during the first half of the 16th century. During the 1550s, there is said to have been three houses in Seinäjoki: the houses of Marttila, Jouppi and Uppa. The house of Jouppila, which separated from the house of Jouppi, was established during the same century. All of the houses were located on the shore of the river.

Seinäjoki belonged to the church parish of Ilmajoki like Kurikka, Kauhajoki, Jalasjärvi and Alavus. However, in the 18th century the roads from Seinäjoki to the Church of Ilmajoki were generally in poor condition. Therefore, the inhabitants of Seinäjoki and the neighbouring Nurmo built a new chapel together in 1725, which in 1765 led to the formation of the chapel town of Nurmo. Seinäjoki, which was called Alaseinäjoki since the Greater Wrath, became a part of the chapel town. The chapel parish of Peräseinäjoki was founded in 1798, and the village of Alaseinäjoki began to be called Seinäjoki again. The very same year, the Östermyra steel mill was founded on the shore of the Seinäjoki river.

In the 1850s, actions were taken to separate Seinäjoki from the church parish of Nurmo. Ilmajoki wanted to connect Seinäjoki back to its own parish. In spite of strong objections from the inhabitants of Nurmo, the Senate of Finland accepted the petition from the inhabitants of Seinäjoki in 1863, to form a chapel congregation of their own. Seinäjoki got an independent local government in 1868. In 1900, Seinäjoki became an independent municipality.

Seinäjoki has grown around a few important railroad crossings. The Tampere–Vaasa railway, which passes through Seinäjoki, was inaugurated in 1883. The track, along with the Kokkola track that was opened for rail service in 1885, and the Kristinestad track which had been completed in 1913, raised Seinäjoki as an important railway crossing section in Finland. In the early 1970s, a direct railway between Tampere and Seinäjoki was opened, and the services of Seinäjoki improved further.

After the Winter War and Continuation War, some refugees from Jaakkima and Lumivaara were resettled to Seinäjoki.

Geography

The neighboring municipalities of Seinäjoki are Kauhava in the north, Lapua in the northeast, Kuortane and Alavus in the east, Virrat and Kihniö in the south, Ilmajoki and Kurikka in the west and Isokyrö in the northwest.

The proportion of water in the Seinäjoki landscape is small. Seinäjoki River flows through the city in a south-east-northwest direction and turns at the northern border of the city center, connecting with the Kyrönjoki River, which flows into the Gulf of Bothnia in the Vaasa area.

The most significant road connections in Seinäjoki are highways 16, 18 (between cities of Vaasa and Jyväskylä), 19 and 67.

Climate

Demographics
Population: 31,696 (2003), 35,918 (2005 after consolidation with Peräseinäjoki) and 56,229 (2009 after consolidation with Nurmo and Ylistaro).
Annual growth: 624

Economy

Nordic Regional Airlines has its financial office in Seinäjoki. Its predecessor, Finncomm Airlines, had its head office on the grounds of Seinäjoki Airport in nearby Ilmajoki.

In terms of market area, Seinäjoki is the sixth largest city in the country. Also Seinäjoki has a nationally and internationally significant food production and R&D industry. Headquartered in Seinäjoki food company Atria Corporation's net sales in 2009 were EUR 1316 million and it employed an average of 6,214 persons in several countries. According to a study published by the Economic Survey at the end of 2018, Seinäjoki has the best image among corporate leaders among the 36 largest Finnish cities and municipalities. The survey had asked the CEOs and CFOs of companies operating in the area about the municipality's affairs.

Seinäjoki also is well known for having a large number of SME's and a big number of shops for its size. One of the most important shopping places in Seinäjoki is the Torikeskus shopping mall in the city center.

Culture
There are many kinds of cultural events in Seinäjoki nowadays. For example, Seinäjoki is known for hosting three large summer events: Tangomarkkinat, which is a tango festival typically attracting more than 100,000 visitors annually, Vauhtiajot, which is a motor racing event/music festival, and Provinssirock, which is one of the largest and oldest rock festivals in Finland. 
Rytmikorjaamo is a popular rock club, wherein almost every weekend some Finnish or international artists perform. In Seinäjoki there are also several other bars and clubs offering live music and other entertainment. The city theatre of Seinäjoki has a wide, quality program throughout the year, offering plays for everyone. The city orchestra of Seinäjoki performs many concerts in the area and has had many tours in Finland and abroad.

Sports

Seinäjoki is home to a big number of sports clubs, such as SJK Seinäjoki, a professional football team that competes in the Finnish Veikkausliiga. SJK is one of the top football teams in Finland and it plays in the brand new OmaSp Stadion. Seinäjoki is also home to Seinäjoki Crocodiles, an American football team.

Sights
Lakeuden Risti Church ("The Cross of the Plains")
Alvar Aalto's cultural and administrative centre, comprising the City Hall,  library and theatre, among others
The Mannerheim Park
The Southern Ostrobothnia District Museum
The Civil Guard and Lotta Svärd Museum, located at the Seinäjoki Civil Guard House
Törnävä church
The railway exhibition
Mallaskoski brewery

Other points of interest
Törnävä Museum Area
the Suviyö trotting-race
Törnävä summer theatre – Seinäjoki
Jouppi mountain winter sports centre
Seinäjoki City Theatre
Provinssirock
Tangomarkkinat
Vauhtiajot

Education
Seinäjoki University of Applied Sciences (SeAMK) is the local higher education institution, that also pursues an international profile.

Notable people
Jukka Hildén, stuntman, The Dudesons
Antti Isotalo, jäger, tribal warrior, Alko's local leader
Katja Kankaanpää, mixed martial artist
Mari Kiviniemi, politician (Prime Minister of Finland 2010—2011)
Paula Koivuniemi, singer
Petri Kontiola, hockey player
Pekka Koskela, speed skater
Jarno Laasala, stuntman, The Dudesons
Hannu Lahtinen, world wrestling champion
Veli Lampi, soccer player
Jarppi Leppälä, stuntman, The Dudesons
Tapio Luoma, Archbishop
Jorma Ollila, former Chairman and CEO of the Nokia Corporation
Hannu-Pekka "HP" Parviainen, snowboarder, stuntman, The Dudesons
Pekka Puska, public health researcher and official
Paula Risikko, Member of Parliament and Minister
Arto Saari, skateboarder
Softengine, rock pop band

International relations

Twin towns — Sister cities
Seinäjoki is twinned with:
 Koszalin, Poland
 Schweinfurt, Germany
 Sopron, Hungary
 Thunder Bay, Ontario, Canada
 Veliky Novgorod, Russia
 Jiangjin District, China

See also 
 Ilmajoki
 Isokyrö
 Lapua
 Peräseinäjoki
 Vaasa

Sources

Literatures

References

Notes

External links

Seinäjoki – Official website
Provinssirock – rock festival
Tangomarkkinat – tango festival

 
Cities and towns in Finland
Populated places established in 1868